"1-800 Suicide" is the third and final single released from the Gravediggaz' debut album, 6 Feet Deep. Produced by Prince Paul (The Undertaker), "1-800 Suicide" was the Gravediggaz final charting single, making it to 46 on the Hot Rap Singles. The song was paired with "Mommy, What's a Gravedigga?" as a Double A-Side, although Gee Street also released "1-800 Suicide" and "Mommy, What's a Gravedigga?" as individuals with exactly the same cover art.  The song can also be found on the soundtrack of the 1995 film Tales from the Crypt presents: Demon Knight, and as the opening theme song for The Leftovers Season 3 episode "Certified".

Complex ranked "1-800-Suicide" at #22 on their list of the 25 most violent rap songs of all time.

Single track listing

A-Side 1
"1-800-Suicide" (Clean Version) – 4:18
"1-800-Suicide" – 4:18
"1-800-Suicide" (Instrumental Version) – 3:41

A-Side 2
"Mommy What's a Gravedigga?" (Clean RZA Mix) – 4:08
"Mommy What's a Gravedigga?" (RZA Mix Instrumental) – 3:34
"Mommy What's a Gravedigga?" – 1:44
"Mommy What's a Gravedigga?" (Album Instrumental) – 1:40

Charts

See also
Suicide, it's a suicide
1-800-273-8255
1-800-273-8255 (song)

References

1995 singles
Gravediggaz songs
Song recordings produced by Prince Paul (producer)
Hardcore hip hop songs
Songs about suicide